Petrotilapia nigra is a species of cichlid endemic to Lake Malawi where it prefers areas with rocky substrates.  It grazes on diatoms that it finds on the algae growing on the rocks.  This species can reach a length  SL.  This species can also be found in the aquarium trade.

References

nigra
Fish of Lake Malawi
Fish of Malawi
Fish described in 1983
Taxonomy articles created by Polbot